The Canton of Domart-en-Ponthieu  is a former canton situated in the department of the Somme and in the Picardie region of northern France. It was disbanded following the French canton reorganisation which came into effect in March 2015. It had 11,590 inhabitants (2012).

Geography 
The canton is organised around the commune of Domart-en-Ponthieu in the arrondissement of Amiens. The altitude varies from 19m at Saint-Ouen to 166m at Bonneville for an average of 73m.

The canton comprised 20 communes:

Berneuil
Berteaucourt-les-Dames
Bonneville
Canaples
Domart-en-Ponthieu
Franqueville
Fransu
Halloy-lès-Pernois
Havernas
Lanches-Saint-Hilaire
Fieffes-Montrelet
Naours
Pernois
Ribeaucourt
Saint-Léger-lès-Domart
Saint-Ouen
Surcamps
Vauchelles-lès-Domart
La Vicogne
Wargnies

Population

See also
 Arrondissements of the Somme department
 Cantons of the Somme department
 Communes of the Somme department

References

Domart-en-Ponthieu
2015 disestablishments in France
States and territories disestablished in 2015